William I, the one-eyed, (19 December 1343, Dresden – 9 February 1407, Schloss Grimma) was Margrave of Meissen. His nickname is related to the legend that Saint Benno appeared to him because of his disputes with the Church in a dream and he had an eye gouged out.

Life 
William was the son of Frederick II, Margrave of Meissen and Mathilde of Bavaria. He had his father and the country until 1382 reigned together with his older brothers and alternately. After his brother Frederick III died 1381, he performed in 1382 with the remaining heirs so-called Division of Chemnitz, in which he was awarded the Margraviate of Meissen for an inheritance. Since 1395 he managed as governor (vicarius) Jobst of Moravia (his brother in law) and the March of Brandenburg. William was one of the most active Wettin princes, worked cleverly to the removal of powers of small noble-free estates in the interior of Meissen and the defence of the Bohemian House of Luxembourg. He also acquired the rule of Colditz, brought the rich possessions of the Burgraviate of Dohna, which he sold (Dohna Feud), in itself, and was a great patron of the Meissen Cathedral whose exemption he successfully helped to enforce. In 1404 William founded the Augustinian Monastery in Dresden, and fitted it out with possessions.

William's first wife was Elizabeth of Moravia (d. 1400), after whose death he married his second wife Anna of Brunswick, daughter of Otto I of Brunswick. Both marriages were childless, so his inheritance fell to his nephews Frederick the Peaceful, Frederick the Belligerent and William the Rich.

Ancestry

References 
 Matthias Donath: Die Grabmonumente im Dom zu Meißen. Leipziger Universitätsverlag, 2005, S. 285-287.
 
 Carl Wenck: Die Wettiner im XIV. Jahrhundert insbesondere Markgraf Wilhelm und König Wenzel nebst einem Exkurs: Der vogtländische Krieg, Duncker & Humblot, Leipzig 1877

Margraves of Meissen
House of Wettin
1343 births
1407 deaths
14th-century German nobility
Nobility from Dresden